S15 may refer to:

Aircraft
 Sikorsky S-15, a protoype Russian biplane floatplane
 Spalinger S.15, a Swiss glider
 Stemme ASP S15, a German sailplane

Automobiles
 GMC Jimmy (S-15), a SUV
 Laffly S15, a family of French all-terrain military vehicles
 Nissan Silvia (S15), a sports car

Rail and transit

Lines 
 S15 (ZVV), an S-Bahn line in Zürich, Switzerland
 Frauenfeld–Wil railway, an S-Bahn line in Switzerland

Locomotives 
 LSWR S15 class, a British steam locomotive

Stations 
 Hataki Station, in Ōzu, Ehime Prefecture, Japan
 Ikawadani Station, in Nishi-ku, Kobe, Hyōgo Prefecture, Japan
 Ojima Station, in Kōtō, Tokyo, Japan
 Otaru Station, in Otaru, Hokkaido, Japan
 Sakuragawa Station (Osaka), in Naniwa-ku, Osaka, Japan
 Sakura-hommachi Station, in Minami-ku, Nagoya, Aichi, Japan

Science 
 40S ribosomal protein S15
 British NVC community S15, a swamps and tall-herb fens community in the British National Vegetation Classification system
 Explorer 11, a NASA satellite
 Ribosomal S15 leader
 S15: Keep away from heat, a safety phrase

Vessels 
 
 
 , a submarine of the Royal Navy
 , a torpedo boat of the Imperial German Navy
 , a submarine of the United States Navy

Other uses
 S15 (classification), a disability swimming classification
 County Route S15 (California)